Adnane is both a surname and a given name. Notable people with the name include:

Youssef Adnane (born 1985), French footballer
Adnane Remmal (born 1962), Moroccan biologist
Adnane Tighadouini (born 1992), Dutch-Moroccan footballer

See also
Adnan (name)